The Karangarua River is located in the west of New Zealand's South Island. It flows northwest from the Southern Alps, entering the Tasman Sea 80 kilometres northeast of Haast. The main tributary of the Karangarua is the Copland River.

Westland District
Rivers of the West Coast, New Zealand
Rivers of New Zealand